Rockin' Radio is a 1983 album by Jazz trumpeter Tom Browne, released on Arista Records. It is his fifth album. His prior album, Yours Truly had success on the charts, but no charting single. Rockin Radio was different. The album peaked at #24 on the R&B album charts and #147 on the Billboard 200 (both lower than Yours Truly), but the title track hit #11 on the R&B charts and #33 on the dance charts. "Crusin'" hit #63 on the R&B charts.

Michael Jonzun and Maurice Starr of The Jonzun Crew both helped write the title track.

Track listing
All tracks composed and arranged by Tom Browne, except where indicated
 "Rockin' Radio"  (Michael Jonzun, Maurice Starr) – 6:14
 "Cruisin'" (David Spradley) – 6:29
 "Turn It Up (Come on Y'all)" (David Spradley, Tom Currier) – 6:30 (featuring Evan Rogers)
 "Angeline" – 4:40
 "Brighter Tomorrow" (Cliff Branch) – 6:18
 "Never My Love" (Richard Addrisi, Donald Addrisi) – 4:18
 "Mr. Business" – 5:46
 "Feel Like Making Love" (Mick Ralphs, Paul Rodgers) – 4:17

References

1983 albums
Tom Browne (trumpeter) albums
Arista Records albums
Albums produced by Michael Jonzun